Surin, Iran is a village in Kurdistan Province, Iran.

Surin, Iran may refer to:
 Soveyreh, Khuzestan Province
 Sadeyreh-ye Olya, Khuzestan Province
 Sadeyreh-ye Sofla, Khuzestan Province